Musca is a genus of flies.  It includes Musca domestica (the housefly), as well as Musca autumnalis (the face fly or autumn housefly).  It is part of the family Muscidae.

Species

M. aethiops  Stein, 1913, Tanzania
M. afra Paterson, 1956,  Tanzania
M. albina Wiedemann, 1830
M. alpesa Walker, 1849 
M. amita Hennig, 1964
M. asiatica Shinonaga & Kano, 1977 
M. autumnalis De Geer, 1776
M. bakeri Patton, 1923
M. bezzii Patton & Cragg, 1913 
M. biseta Hough, 1898
M. cadaverum (Kirby, 1837) 
M. calleva Walker, 1849
M. callvea Walker, 1849 
M. capensis Zielke, 1971
M. cassara Pont, 1973 
M conducens Walker, 1859
M. confiscata Speiser, 1924
M convexifrons Thomson, 1869
M. craggi Patton, 1922
M. crassirostris Stein, 1903
M. curviforceps Saccà & Rivosechi, 1956 
M. dasyops Stein, 1913
M. domestica Linnaeus, 1758
M. d. calleva Walker, 1849
M. d. domestica Linnaeus, 1758
M. elatior Villeneuve, 1937 
M. emdeni Nandi & Sinha, 2004
M. ethiopica Zielke, 1973 
M. fergusoni Johnston & Bancroft, 1920 Australia (Qld) 
M. fletcheri Patton & Senior-White, 1924
M. formosana Malloch, 1925 
M. freedmani Paterson, 1957 
M. gabonensis Macquart, 1855
M. heidiae Zielke, 1974
M. hervei Villeneuve, 1922
M. hugonis Pont, 1980 
M. illingworthi  Patton, 1923 
M. inferior Stein, 1909
M. intermedia (Fallen, 1825)
M. larvipara Porchinskiy, 1910
M. lasiopa Villeneuve, 1936
M. lasiophthalma Thomson, 1869 
M. liberia Snyder, 1951 
M. lindneri Paterson, 1956
M. lothari Zielke, 1974 
M. lucidula (Loew, 1856)
M. lusoria Wiedemann, 1824
M. mactans (Fabricius, 1787)
M. malaisei Emden, 1965
M. mallochi Thompson & Pont, 1994
M. meruensis Zielke, 1973 
M. munroi Patton, 1936 
M. negriabdomina Awati, 1916 
M. nevilli Kleynhans, 1987
M. osiris Wiedemann, 1830
M. patersoni Zielke, 1971 
M. pattoni Austen, 1910 
M. pilifacies Emden, 1965 
M. planiceps Wiedemann, 1824
M. pseudocorvina Emden, 1939
M. ruralis (Gravenhorst, 1807)
M. santoshi Joseph & Parui, 1972 
M. seniorwhitei Patton, 1922
M. setulosa Zielke, 1971 
M. somalorum Bezzi, 1892 
M. sorbens Wiedemann, 1830
M. spangleri Zielke, 1971
M. splendens Pont, 1980 
M. stabulans (Fallen, 1817) 
M. striatacta Awati, 1916
M. suecica (Villers, 1789) 
M. tahitiensis (Lichtenstein, 1796)
M. tempestatum (Bezzi, 1908)
M. tempestiva Fallén, 1817
M. terraereginae Johnston & Bancroft, 1920
M. tibetana Fan, 1978 
M. transvaalensis Zielke, 1971 
M. ugandae Emden, 1939 
M. ventrosa Wiedemann, 1830
M. vetustissima Walker, 1849
M. vilis (Gravenhorst, 1807)
M villeneuvii Patton, 1922
M. vitripennis Meigen, 1826
M. wittweri Zielke, 1974
M. xanthomelas Wiedemann, 1824

References

Muscidae genera
Muscidae
Household pest insects
Muscomorph flies of Europe
Taxa named by Carl Linnaeus